Kamionka may refer to any of the following places:

Kamionka, Golub-Dobrzyń County in Kuyavian-Pomeranian Voivodeship (north-central Poland)
Kamionka, Lubartów County, in Lublin Voivodeship (east Poland)
Kamionka, Biłgoraj County in Lublin Voivodeship (east Poland)
Kamionka, Chełm County in Lublin Voivodeship (east Poland)
Kamionka, Białystok County in Podlaskie Voivodeship (north-east Poland)
Kamionka, Mońki County in Podlaskie Voivodeship (north-east Poland)
Kamionka, Suwałki County in Podlaskie Voivodeship (north-east Poland)
Kamionka, Radomsko County in Łódź Voivodeship (central Poland)
Kamionka, Sieradz County in Łódź Voivodeship (central Poland)
Kamionka, Wieluń County in Łódź Voivodeship (central Poland)
Kamionka, Wieruszów County in Łódź Voivodeship (central Poland)
Kamionka, Łuków County in Lublin Voivodeship (east Poland)
Kamionka, Opole Lubelskie County in Lublin Voivodeship (east Poland)
Kamionka, Lesser Poland Voivodeship (south Poland)
Kamionka, Nisko County in Subcarpathian Voivodeship (south-east Poland)
Kamionka, Ropczyce-Sędziszów County in Subcarpathian Voivodeship (south-east Poland)
Kamionka, Ciechanów County in Masovian Voivodeship (east-central Poland)
Kamionka, Garwolin County in Masovian Voivodeship (east-central Poland)
Kamionka, Gmina Jakubów in Masovian Voivodeship (east-central Poland)
Kamionka, Gmina Latowicz in Masovian Voivodeship (east-central Poland)
Kamionka, Gmina Piaseczno in Masovian Voivodeship (east-central Poland)
Kamionka, Gmina Prażmów in Masovian Voivodeship (east-central Poland)
Kamionka, Gmina Mszczonów in Masovian Voivodeship (east-central Poland)
Kamionka, Gmina Radziejowice in Masovian Voivodeship (east-central Poland)
Kamionka, Gmina Wiskitki in Masovian Voivodeship (east-central Poland)
Kamionka, Chodzież County in Greater Poland Voivodeship (west-central Poland)
Kamionka, Czarnków-Trzcianka County in Greater Poland Voivodeship (west-central Poland)
Kamionka, Gniezno County in Greater Poland Voivodeship (west-central Poland)
Kamionka, Konin County in Greater Poland Voivodeship (west-central Poland)
Kamionka, Szamotuły County in Greater Poland Voivodeship (west-central Poland)
Kamionka, Turek County in Greater Poland Voivodeship (west-central Poland)
Kamionka, Lubusz Voivodeship (west Poland)
Kamionka, Opole Voivodeship (south-west Poland)
Kamionka, Bytów County in Pomeranian Voivodeship (north Poland)
Kamionka, Gmina Chojnice in Pomeranian Voivodeship (north Poland)
Kamionka, Chojnice County in Pomeranian Voivodeship (north Poland)
Kamionka, Kartuzy County in Pomeranian Voivodeship (north Poland)
Kamionka, Kwidzyn County in Pomeranian Voivodeship (north Poland)
Kamionka, Malbork County in Pomeranian Voivodeship (north Poland)
Kamionka, Starogard County in Pomeranian Voivodeship (north Poland)
Kamionka, Iława County in Warmian-Masurian Voivodeship (north Poland)
Kamionka, Nidzica County in Warmian-Masurian Voivodeship (north Poland)
Kamionka, Nowe Miasto County in Warmian-Masurian Voivodeship (north Poland)
Kamionka, Olsztyn County in Warmian-Masurian Voivodeship (north Poland)
Kamionka, Ostróda County in Warmian-Masurian Voivodeship (north Poland)
Kamionka, Gryfino County in West Pomeranian Voivodeship (north-west Poland)
Kamionka, Stargard County in West Pomeranian Voivodeship (north-west Poland)
Kamionka, Szczecinek County in West Pomeranian Voivodeship (north-west Poland)
Kamionka, Mikołów in Silesian Voivodeship (south Poland)

See also
Kamenka (disambiguation)
Kamianka (disambiguation)
Kamienka (disambiguation)